Sint-Truiden railway station is a railway station in the town of Sint-Truiden, Limburg, Belgium. The station opened on 2 April 1838 and is located on line 21. The train services are operated by National Railway Company of Belgium (NMBS).

Sint-Truiden used to be located on 23 (Drieslinter-Tongeren).

The current station dates from the 1970s and replaced a building dating from 1882 which was demolished in 1975. In 2005, the station and its surrounding area was modernized. Extra bike parking was created.

Train services
The station is served by the following services:

Intercity services (IC-03) Knokke/Blankenberge - Bruges - Ghent - Brussels - Leuven - Hasselt - Genk

References

External links
 

Railway stations in Belgium
Railway stations in Limburg (Belgium)
Railway stations in Belgium opened in 1839